The 2018 Norfolk State Spartans football team represented Norfolk State University in the 2018 NCAA Division I FCS football season. They were led by third-year head coach Latrell Scott and played their home games at William "Dick" Price Stadium. They were a member of the Mid-Eastern Athletic Conference (MEAC). They finished the season 4–7, 2–5 in MEAC play to finish in a tie for eighth place.

Previous season
The Spartans finished the 2017 season 4–7, 4–4 in MEAC play to finish in sixth place.

Preseason

MEAC preseason poll
In a vote of the MEAC head coaches and sports information directors, the Spartans were picked to finish in sixth place.

Preseason All-MEAC Teams
The Spartans had seven players at eight positions selected to the preseason all-MEAC teams.

Offense

2nd team

Marcus Taylor – WR

Wes Jones – C

Kenneth Kirby – OL

3rd team

Aaron Savage – RB

Defense

1st team

Nigel Chavis – LB

2nd team

J.T. Wahee – DB

3rd team

Deshaywn Middleton – DL

Special teams

1st team

Marcus Taylor – RS

Schedule

Source: Schedule

Despite also being a member of the MEAC, the game vs South Carolina State will be considered a non-conference game and have no effect on the MEAC standings.

Game summaries

Virginia State

James Madison

Due to inclement weather, the JMU–Norfolk State game was mutually ended after the first quarter.

at South Carolina State

Delaware State

at Florida A&M

North Carolina Central

at Savannah State

at North Carolina A&T

Howard

Morgan State

at Liberty

This game was originally scheduled for September 15, but was moved to December 1 due to Hurricane Florence.

Coaching staff

References

Norfolk State
Norfolk State Spartans football seasons
Norfolk State Spartans football